Buncombe is a village in Johnson County, Illinois, United States. The population was 203 at the 2010 census and as of 2018, the population had declined to an estimated 173.

Geography
Buncombe is located in western Johnson County at  (37.470987, -88.974935). Illinois Route 37 passes through the village, leading north  to Goreville and south  to Cypress.

Demographics

As of the census of 2000, there were 186 people, 75 households, and 53 families residing in the village. The racial makeup of the village was 99.46% White and 0.54% Native American.

There were 75 households, out of which 29.3% had children under the age of 18 living with them, 58.7% were married couples living together, 6.7% had a female householder with no husband present, and 29.3% were non-families. 28.0% of all households were made up of individuals, and 10.7% had someone living alone who was 65 years of age or older.  The average household size was 2.48 and the average family size was 3.04.

In the village, the population was spread out, with 24.2% under the age of 18, 8.1% from 18 to 24, 28.5% from 25 to 44, 23.7% from 45 to 64, and 15.6% who were 65 years of age or older.  The median age was 40 years. For every 100 females, there were 121.4 males.  For every 100 females age 18 and over, there were 127.4 males.

The median income for a household in the village was $31,500, and the median income for a family was $33,472. Males had a median income of $29,000 versus $20,417 for females. The per capita income for the village was $14,975.  About 1.6% of families and 8.5% of the population were below the poverty line, including 8.7% of those under the age of eighteen and none of those 65 or over.

History
Buncombe was named for the settlers who came from Buncombe County, North Carolina.

References

Villages in Johnson County, Illinois
Villages in Illinois